The women's elite time trial at the 2022 European Road Championships took place on 17 August 2022, in Munich, Germany. Nations are allowed to enter a maximum of 2 riders into the event.

Results

References

Women's elite